Ouenza is a town in Tébessa Province, in far eastern Algeria; near the border with Tunisia; 43 km south of Souk Ahras; and west of M'Daourouch.

Demographics
The population is 52,000. Ethnologically, the city draws its population from the diverse surrounding regions, including Souk Ahras, Taoura, Annaba, Guelma, Tebessa, Chréa, El-meridj, Ain Zerga, Meskiana and others.

Life in Ouenza
Ouenza was built by the French Société de l'Ouenza at the start of the Twentieth Century, to exploit  the iron ore deposits that have been the basis of economic growth in the region for over 100 years. Originally, workers from Morocco, Tunisia, Libya and other regions of Algeria came to Ouenza, contributing to its cultural diversity and making the town unique in the region. But once these workers retired and returned home with their families, they were replaced by inhabitants of Ouenza's neighbouring villages.

Ouenza's location brings it a dry climate, with hot summers and cold winters. The majority of the inhabitants leave for coastal towns such as Annaba and el Kala during the summer season.

Ouenza has a number of locations very popular with its inhabitants. One of these, the suq, is known by its colonial name, SAS. People of all ages gather at the boulodrome, named "le Cercle", to watch the game of pétanque. The main supermarket is named "L'économat". There is also a village hall  with a 400-seat cinema and air conditioning. There are also three tennis courts and the football field of the local team OSO. Recently a number of cybercafes have emerged, catering for the tastes of the young people.

Mining and its ecological impact 
The transportation of iron ore raises clouds of dust throughout the city, making hygienic life difficult and discoloring paintwork. Locals also suffer a number of lung complaints from inhalation of the dust, particularly silicosis.  After years of exposure, most of Ouenza's miners eventually suffer from this affliction, caused by inhaling silica dust, and many die from its complications.

See also 

 Iron ore in Africa

References

Communes of Tébessa Province
Cities in Algeria